Collinsville Independent School District is a public school district based in Collinsville, Texas (USA).

In 2009, the school district was rated "academically acceptable" by the Texas Education Agency.

Schools
 Collinsville Junior High/High School (grades 7-12)
 Collinsville Elementary (grades K-6)

References

External links
 

School districts in Grayson County, Texas